A list of fungus species of the genus Hygrophorus appears below. Many species formerly included in this genus are now placed in the genus Hygrocybe. There are approximately 100 species in the genus.

Hygrophorus abieticola
Hygrophorus acutus
Hygrophorus adiaphorus
Hygrophorus agathosmus - gray almond waxy cap, almond woodwax
Hygrophorus albicarneus
Hygrophorus albicastaneus
Hygrophorus albiflavus
Hygrophorus albinellus
Hygrophorus albipes
Hygrophorus albofuscus
Hygrophorus alboumbonatus
Hygrophorus amarus
Hygrophorus amygdalinus
Hygrophorus arbustivus
Hygrophorus arenicola
Hygrophorus arnoldae
Hygrophorus atramentosus
Hygrophorus atro-olivaceus
Hygrophorus aurantiacus
Hygrophorus avellaneifolius
Hygrophorus badakensis
Hygrophorus bakerensis
Hygrophorus bakeri
Hygrophorus barbatulus
Hygrophorus bipindiensis
Hygrophorus brevipes
Hygrophorus buccinulus
Hygrophorus burgdorfensis
Hygrophorus burnhamii
Hygrophorus caeruleus
Hygrophorus caespitosus
Hygrophorus camarophylloides
Hygrophorus camarophyllus - arched woodwax
Hygrophorus carcharias
Hygrophorus carnescens
Hygrophorus cavipes
Hygrophorus chrysoconos
Hygrophorus chrysodon - gold flecked woodwax
Hygrophorus cinereipallens
Hygrophorus cokeri
Hygrophorus coloratus
Hygrophorus compressus
Hygrophorus congelatus
Hygrophorus conicopalustris
Hygrophorus constans
Hygrophorus corticola
Hygrophorus cossus
Hygrophorus cremeus
Hygrophorus cremicolor
Hygrophorus croceophyllus
Hygrophorus croceus
Hygrophorus decipiens
Hygrophorus diaphanes
Hygrophorus dichrous
Hygrophorus discoxanthus (formerly H. chrysaspis) + * North American species of Hygrophorus by L.R. Hesler and Alexander H. Smith, 1963. (Full text of monograph) - yellowing woodwax
Hygrophorus eburneiformis
Hygrophorus eburneus - ivory woodwax
Hygrophorus elegans
Hygrophorus elegantulus
Hygrophorus ellenae
Hygrophorus erubescens - blotched woodwax
Hygrophorus fagi
Hygrophorus fallax
Hygrophorus fibrillosus
Hygrophorus flavonitens
Hygrophorus fleischerianus
Hygrophorus foliirubens
Hygrophorus fragicolor
Hygrophorus fragrans
Hygrophorus fuligineus
Hygrophorus fulvosiformis
Hygrophorus fumosellus
Hygrophorus furcatus
Hygrophorus fuscoalboides
Hygrophorus fuscovillosulus
Hygrophorus gedehensis
Hygrophorus globisporus
Hygrophorus gloriae
Hygrophorus glutinosus
Hygrophorus goetzii
Hygrophorus gomphidioides
Hygrophorus graciae
Hygrophorus graveolens
Hygrophorus hedrychii
Hygrophorus hiemalis
Hygrophorus hispidus
Hygrophorus hyacinthus
Hygrophorus hypholomoides
Hygrophorus hypothejus - herald of winter (Europe)
Hygrophorus igneus
Hygrophorus imazekii
Hygrophorus impudicus
Hygrophorus inocybiformis
Hygrophorus inocyboides
Hygrophorus involutus
Hygrophorus isabellinus
Hygrophorus jozzolus
Hygrophorus juruensis
Hygrophorus kauffmanii
Hygrophorus kilimandscharicus
Hygrophorus korhonenii
Hygrophorus lactarioides
Hygrophorus latitabundus
Hygrophorus lawrencei
Hygrophorus leucophaeo-ilicis
Hygrophorus lignicola
Hygrophorus lilacinogriseus
Hygrophorus lindtneri
Hygrophorus lucorum - larch woodwax
Hygrophorus luridoflavus
Hygrophorus mamillatus
Hygrophorus marianae
Hygrophorus maroniensis
Hygrophorus marzuolus
Hygrophorus megasporus
Hygrophorus meridionalis
Hygrophorus mesotephrus - ashen woodwax
Hygrophorus mexicanus
Hygrophorus montanus
Hygrophorus monticola
Hygrophorus morrisii
Hygrophorus mugnalus
Hygrophorus multifolius
Hygrophorus mutabilis
Hygrophorus nemoreus - oak woodwax
Hygrophorus nigridius
Hygrophorus niveicolor
Hygrophorus nordmanensis
Hygrophorus nothofagi
Hygrophorus obconicus
Hygrophorus obscuratus
Hygrophorus occidentalis
Hygrophorus ochraceomellinus
Hygrophorus odoratus
Hygrophorus olivaceoalbus
Hygrophorus olivaceonitens
Hygrophorus olivaceus
Hygrophorus olivascens
Hygrophorus opacoides
Hygrophorus pacificus
Hygrophorus paigei
Hygrophorus pallidus
Hygrophorus paludosoides
Hygrophorus paludosus
Hygrophorus palustris
Hygrophorus patagonicus
Hygrophorus penarioides
Hygrophorus penarius - matt woodwax
Hygrophorus perfumus
Hygrophorus persicolor
Hygrophorus persoonii (formerly H. limacinus)
Hygrophorus piceae
Hygrophorus pinetorum
Hygrophorus plumbeus
Hygrophorus poetarum
Hygrophorus proximus
Hygrophorus pseudochrysaspis
Hygrophorus pseudococcineus
Hygrophorus pseudodiscoideus
Hygrophorus pseudoericeus
Hygrophorus pseudoisabellinus
Hygrophorus pseudolucorum
Hygrophorus pseudopallidus
Hygrophorus pseudoparvulus
Hygrophorus pseudotephroleucus
Hygrophorus pudorinus - rosy woodwax
Hygrophorus pulcherrimus
Hygrophorus purpurascens
Hygrophorus purpureobadius
Hygrophorus pustulatus (edible)
Hygrophorus pyrophilus
Hygrophorus quadricolor
Hygrophorus quercuum
Hygrophorus recurvatus
Hygrophorus robustus
Hygrophorus roseiceps
Hygrophorus roseobrunneus
Hygrophorus roseodiscoideus
Hygrophorus roseus
Hygrophorus rubellus
Hygrophorus rubripes
Hygrophorus rubrococcineus
Hygrophorus rubropunctus
Hygrophorus rufus
Hygrophorus russula - pinkmottle woodwax
Hygrophorus russuliformis
Hygrophorus salmonipes
Hygrophorus salmonicolor
Hygrophorus saxatilis
Hygrophorus secretanii
Hygrophorus segregatus
Hygrophorus serotinus
Hygrophorus siccipes
Hygrophorus siccus
Hygrophorus silvaticus
Hygrophorus sitchensis
Hygrophorus sordidus
Hygrophorus speciosus
Hygrophorus sphaerosporus
Hygrophorus spodoleucus
Hygrophorus squamulifer
Hygrophorus stagninus
Hygrophorus stowellii
Hygrophorus subalpinus - subalpine waxycap
Hygrophorus subaromaticus
Hygrophorus subaustraligus
Hygrophorus subbasidiosus
Hygrophorus subcaespitosus
Hygrophorus subcitrinopallidus
Hygrophorus subcoccineus
Hygrophorus subconicus
Hygrophorus subellenae
Hygrophorus subflavidus
Hygrophorus subfusoideus
Hygrophorus subisabellinus
Hygrophorus sublutescens
Hygrophorus subminiatus
Hygrophorus subniveus
Hygrophorus subolivaceoalbus
Hygrophorus subpratensis
Hygrophorus subpungens
Hygrophorus subpustulatus
Hygrophorus subruber
Hygrophorus subrufescens
Hygrophorus subsalmonius
Hygrophorus subsordidus
Hygrophorus subvirgineus
Hygrophorus subviscifer
Hygrophorus suzannae
Hygrophorus sydowianus
Hygrophorus tahquamenonensis
Hygrophorus tenax
Hygrophorus tennesseensis
Hygrophorus terebratus
Hygrophorus tessellatus
Hygrophorus testaceus
Hygrophorus tjibodensis
Hygrophorus uliginosus
Hygrophorus umbrinus
Hygrophorus undulatus
Hygrophorus unicolor
Hygrophorus variabilis
Hygrophorus variicolor
Hygrophorus vaticanus
Hygrophorus velatus
Hygrophorus vernalis
Hygrophorus vinicolor
Hygrophorus virgatulus
Hygrophorus viscidipes
Hygrophorus viscosissimus
Hygrophorus waikanaensis
Hygrophorus westii
Hygrophorus whitei

References

Hygrophorus